The seventeenth season of the American medical drama television series Grey's Anatomy was ordered in May 2019, by the American Broadcasting Company (ABC), as part of a double renewal with the sixteenth season. Shortly after, Krista Vernoff signed an agreement to continue serving as the showrunner of the series. Filming on the series began in September 2020 while the season did not premiere until November 12, 2020, both dates being delayed as a result of the COVID-19 pandemic, for the 2020–2021 broadcast television season. The impact of the COVID-19 pandemic on television only allowed seventeen episodes to be produced, the fewest of any season since the fourth season. Numerous safety protocols were also implemented across various areas of production to prevent COVID-19 transmission.

All starring cast members from the previous season returned with the exception of Justin Chambers, who departed early in the sixteenth season. In addition, Richard Flood and Anthony Hill, who both appeared in the sixteenth season in recurring and guest capacities, respectively, received promotions to the main cast. This season also marked the return of former series regulars Patrick Dempsey, T. R. Knight, Chyler Leigh, and Eric Dane to the series. Meanwhile, main cast members Giacomo Gianniotti, Jesse Williams, and Greg Germann all departed the series during the season. Former series regular Sarah Drew also appeared in the season as part of Williams' departure.

Grey's Anatomy centers around the professional and personal lives of a group of medical professionals that work at the fictional Grey Sloan Memorial Hospital. Nearly every main storyline in the season centered around the COVID-19 pandemic, with a number of plot points also connecting to spin-off series Station 19 through fictional crossover events. The season primarily received mixed reviews from critics and remained ABC's most-watched scripted series, even though viewing figures dropped significantly from the previous season. The season eventually concluded on June 3, 2021. Despite initial uncertainty from the cast, crew, and the network, the series was eventually renewed for an eighteenth season.

Episodes

The number in the "No. overall" column refers to the episode's number within the overall series, whereas the number in the "No. in season" column refers to the episode's number within this particular season. "U.S. viewers in millions" refers to the number of Americans in millions who watched the episodes live. Each episode of this season is named after a song.

Cast and characters

Main
 Ellen Pompeo as Dr. Meredith Grey
 Chandra Wilson as Dr. Miranda Bailey
 James Pickens Jr. as Dr. Richard Webber
 Kevin McKidd as Dr. Owen Hunt
 Jesse Williams as Dr. Jackson Avery
 Caterina Scorsone as Dr. Amelia Shepherd
 Camilla Luddington as Dr. Jo Wilson
 Kelly McCreary as Dr. Maggie Pierce
 Giacomo Gianniotti as Dr. Andrew DeLuca
 Kim Raver as Dr. Teddy Altman
 Greg Germann as Dr. Tom Koracick
 Jake Borelli as Dr. Levi Schmitt
 Chris Carmack as Dr. Atticus "Link" Lincoln
 Richard Flood as Dr. Cormac Hayes
 Anthony Hill as Dr. Winston Ndugu

Recurring
 Patrick Dempsey as Dr. Derek Shepherd
 Jason George as Dr. Ben Warren
 Debbie Allen as Dr. Catherine Fox
 Stefania Spampinato as Dr. Carina DeLuca
 Alex Landi as Dr. Nico Kim
 Jaicy Elliot as Dr. Taryn Helm
 Mackenzie Marsh as Val Ashton
 Lisa Vidal as Dr. Alma Ortiz
 Melissa DuPrey as Dr. Sara Ortiz
 Nikhil Shukla as Dr. Reza Khan
 Robert I. Mesa as Dr. James Chee
 Zaiver Sinnett as Dr. Zander Perez

Notable guests
 T. R. Knight as Dr. George O'Malley
 Eric Dane as Dr. Mark Sloan
 Chyler Leigh as Dr. Lexie Grey
 Sarah Drew as Dr. April Kepner 
 Barrett Doss as Victoria "Vic" Hughes
 Jay Hayden as Travis Montgomery
 Grey Damon as LT Jack Gibson
 Danielle Savre as Captain Maya Bishop
 Okieriete Onaodowan as Dean Miller
 T. J. Thyne as Aaron Morris
 Dorien Wilson as Clifford Ndugu
 Sherri Saum as Allison Brown 
 Frankie Faison as William Bailey
 Bianca Taylor as Elena Bailey
 Bess Armstrong as Maureen Lincoln
 Granville Ames as Eric Lincoln
 Phylicia Rashad as Nell Timms
 Eric Roberts as Robert Avery
 Kyle Harris as Dr. Mason Post
 Debra Mooney as Evelyn Hunt

Production

Development
On May 10, 2019, ABC renewed Grey's Anatomy for both a sixteenth and seventeenth season. Krista Vernoff, who serves as the series showrunner and an executive producer, signed a multi-year deal with ABC Studios in 2019 to continue working on Grey's Anatomy and spin-off series Station 19. The deal also attached Vernoff's production company, Trip the Light Productions, to the series. Production on the sixteenth season was later cut short as a result of the COVID-19 pandemic, finishing only twenty-one of the twenty-five episodes ordered; at the time it was unknown whether or not the four additional episodes would be produced as part of the seventeenth season. In September 2020, Variety reported that the season would begin filming later that month. Pompeo announced that filming had begun on September 8. An ABC insider later revealed that the network was looking to produce a season of sixteen episodes, down from the twenty-four to twenty-five episodes per season that had been produced since the eighth season, but that the number could change since conditions were uncertain due to COVID. One additional episode was ordered, bringing the total episode count of the season up to seventeen.

The lower episode count caused the season to tie with the fourth for the second-lowest number of episodes, only having more than the first. To limit the spread of COVID-19, cast and crew members only worked ten-hour days compared to the usual twelve hours. The number of people in each scene also had to be reduced to allow for social distancing. Vernoff said that face masks were worn by all cast and crew members while not filming, including between takes and during rehearsals, and that speaking was not allowed in the hair and makeup trailer. Cast members carried their own makeup bags to do last-minute touch-ups, and different camera lenses were used to make people standing far apart appear closer together. In addition, the cast and crew members received testing for the virus three times a week. In March 2021, Deadline Hollywood reported that another spin-off series was in the works following an interview with ABC Entertainment President Craig Erwich. A few days later, ABC Signature President Jonnie David clarified that they only meant to show support towards Grey's Anatomy and that a spin-off was not being discussed as the network was focused on future seasons of Grey's Anatomy. Despite an initial uncertain future from Vernoff, Pompeo, and network executives, the series was renewed for an eighteenth season.

Casting

Kim Raver, Camilla Luddington, and Kevin McKidd each signed a three-year contract in July 2020, keeping them attached to the series through a potential nineteenth season to portray Dr. Teddy Altman, Dr. Jo Wilson, and Dr. Owen Hunt, respectively. On July 30, 2020, it was announced that Richard Flood and Anthony Hill had been promoted to series regulars. Flood recurred in the previous season as Dr. Cormac Hayes while Hill made a guest appearance in the nineteenth episode of the sixteenth season as Dr. Winston Ndugu. Justin Chambers was the only main cast member from the previous season not to return to the series after departing early in the sixteenth season.

A number of previous series regulars appeared in the season during a storyline revolving around Meredith Grey battling COVID-19 while imagining herself on a beach. Patrick Dempsey was the first actor to return to the series as Dr. Derek Shepherd; Dempsey's last appearance was in the eleventh-season finale, "You're My Home". He recurred throughout the season, appearing in four episodes total. T. R. Knight also returned as Dr. George O'Malley in "You'll Never Walk Alone"; Knight last appeared in "Now or Never" in the fifth season. Chyler Leigh and Eric Dane both appeared in "Breathe" as Dr. Lexie Grey and Dr. Mark Sloan, respectively. Prior to their return, Leigh and Dane last appeared in the eighth-season finale "Flight" and "Remember the Time", the second episode of the ninth season. Due to travel restrictions, Leigh was not able to travel to Los Angeles where production takes place, instead she filmed her scenes in Vancouver, Canada. Leigh was filming Supergirl at the time; a green screen was used to eventually place her on the beach and an apple box was used to simulate rocks while tennis balls were used in place of Pompeo and Dane for dialogue portions.

Giacomo Gianniotti, who portrayed Dr. Andrew DeLuca, exited the series as a main character after being killed off in "Helplessly Hoping." He later appeared in two other episodes as a vision to Raver's Dr. Teddy Altman. On May 6, 2021, it was reported that Jesse Williams, who joined the series in the sixth season as Dr. Jackson Avery, would be departing as a series regular following the fifteenth episode, "Tradition". As part of his departure, former series regular Sarah Drew returned as Dr. April Kepner in Williams' penultimate episode, "Look Up Child", after last appearing in the fourteenth-season episode "All of Me". Greg Germann, who had portrayed Dr. Tom Koracick since the fourteenth season, also departed in "Tradition", being written out in the same storyline as Williams' character. Williams and Germann both briefly reprised their roles in the season finale, "Someone Saved My Life Tonight." Germann is expected to return as a guest star in later seasons while Williams said that he would be open to returning in the following season.

Stefania Spampinato continued to make recurring appearances in the season as Dr. Carina DeLuca after being promoted to a series regular on spin-off series Station 19. Debbie Allen and former series regular Jason George also continued to appear in recurring roles as Dr. Catherine Fox and Dr. Ben Warren, respectively; with George also being a series regular on Station 19. Phylicia Rashad, Allen's sister, guest starred in the season's twelfth episode, "Sign O' the Times". In addition, Barrett Doss, Jay Hayden, Grey Damon, Danielle Savre, and Okieriete Onaodowan made guest appearances as their Station 19 characters in crossover events. Mackenzie Marsh was cast in a recurring role for the season to play Val Ashton. Eric Roberts reprised his role as Robert Avery in "Look Up Child". Lisa Vidal and Melissa DuPrey recurred as a mother-daughter pair named Alma and Sara Ortiz who were part of Grey Sloan's new intern class. Robert I. Mesa was also cast in a recurring role for the season portraying James Chee, the first indigenous doctor on the series.

Writing
The overarching storyline of the season centered around the doctors in the series battling the COVID-19 pandemic. Krista Vernoff initially considered beginning the season prior to the pandemic or not including it at all, but ultimately decided to begin it in the peak of it, stating: 

To properly tell the story of the pandemic, the writers opted to begin the season in April 2020, with time slowly progressing throughout the season, instead of telling the story from a present-day standpoint, as done in previous seasons. Zoanne Clack, a medical doctor who serves as a consultant, writer, and executive producer on the series and previously worked for the Centers for Disease Control and Prevention, said that the goal of the season was to accurately show the infection rate and transfer of COVID-19. A sub-storyline centered around the pandemic was Meredith Grey contracting COVID-19 early in the season. Grey drifted in and out of consciousness throughout the season imagining herself on a beach scene seeing past and present characters of the series. Other central characters were also written to have COVID-19 including Germann's Tom Koracick and the mother of Dr. Miranda Bailey. Bailey's portrayer Chandra Wilson stated that nursing homes, where the character's mother was located, were largely affected by COVID-19 so that when the script was given to her she knew that the experience needed to be told.

 The second half of the season picked up in May 2020. These storylines in the season encompassed both Grey's Anatomy and Station 19 through fictional crossover events. One of these finished the story centered around the mental health of Gianniotti's Andrew DeLuca, which was introduced in the sixteenth season, regarding a patient that had been sexually abused and human trafficked. The storyline was finished by DeLuca's death as a result of a stabbing that occurred in Station 19. Sources close to the production of the series reported that the sixteenth season was supposed to include a character death. However, these plans were scrapped when the season was cut short due to the pandemic; Vernoff said that the death would not have been DeLuca because she wanted to show that people could experience a mental health crisis and be successful afterwards.

The season also touched on other issues such as police brutality, racial profiling, and the murder of George Floyd. The episode centering around George Floyd included the internal conflict of characters deciding whether or not to participate in protests. The exit of Williams' and Germann's characters, Jackson Avery and Koracick, respectively, was explained by their characters leaving Seattle and traveling to Boston in aim to "combat the inequalities in medicine as leaders of the Avery Foundation." Germann's character stated before leaving, "I want to be an ally, I want to spend whatever time I've got left making this lousy, stinking place better, I'll operate, I'll administrate, I'll do anything. I don't want money, I don't want a title, just let me help", and explaining that while he was in the hospital with COVID-19 that he had six roommates and was the only white person. Later storylines in the season centered around COVID-19 vaccine trials and the struggles of adoption. The final two episodes featured periodic time jumps, allowing the final episode to end in April 2021.

Release

Broadcast
When ABC revealed its fall schedule for the 2020–2021 broadcast television season, it was reported that the season would hold its previous timeslot of Thursdays at 9:00pm Eastern Time (ET), serving as a lead-out of Station 19. It was later announced that the season premiere would take place on November 12, 2020. The second episode of the season aired outside its regular time slot at 10:00pm ET, immediately following the first episode in a two-hour back-to-back timeslot. Six episodes aired prior to the mid-season finale on December 17. ABC initially planned to air the remaining episodes beginning on March 4, 2021, but delayed its return by one week. The second half of the season then began airing on March 11, 2021, with the season's seventh episode. This episode also aired outside of its regular timeslot due to a programming delay as a result of a presidential address by Joe Biden, and began broadcasting at 9:25pm ET. The season finale aired on June 3. Internationally, the season aired in simulcast in Canada on CTV while in the United Kingdom episodes began airing on Sky Witness on April 17, 2021.

Home media and streaming services
Hulu continued to hold next-day streaming video on demand rights to the series during the season and the most recently aired episodes were also available for streaming on the ABC website. The season was added to Netflix on July 3, 2021, as part of a streaming deal that adds some ABC Shondaland series to Netflix thirty days after the final episode of the season airs. Outside of the United States, the season, along with all past seasons, was added to Star, a content hub within the Disney+ streaming service. A 4-disc DVD set containing all seventeen episodes was released in multiple regions on June 7, 2021.

Reception

Critical response
Ani Bundel with NBC Think stated that the season stayed true to the medical community, noting that even though cheerful and funny moments were mixed in, viewers were not able to forget how many people had died. Alex Cranz from Jezebel felt that the season premiere crossover was "a series of memes ripped straight out of May 2020 instead of November 2020", writing that he would have liked to see the episodes three to four months earlier. TVLines Charlie Mason mentioned that the rules of Meredith's beach were confusing because she was able to see people that were both dead and alive, also saying that although it seemed nice at first, it eventually lost its appeal. Meanwhile, Jack Wilhelmi from Screen Rant said that the return of Patrick Dempsey to the series was a "major mistake"; however, Saloni Gajjar of The A.V. Club stated that all of the former series regulars that returned during the season helped bring nostalgia to the series, particularly mentioning Sarah Drew giving Williams' character a believable exit. Rebecca Nicholson from The Guardian said that the show properly made what is considered the new normal, normal.

Awards and nominations
Patrick Dempsey and T. R. Knight both received a nomination in the 2021 Gold Derby Awards for Best Drama Guest Actor. The award was lost to Charles Dance for his work on The Crown. The season was awarded The ReFrame Stamp, a certification given to scripted television productions that hire "women or individuals of other underrepresented gender identities/expressions [...] in four out of eight key roles including writer, director, producer, lead, co-leads, and department heads." At the 47th People's Choice Awards Grey's Anatomy was nominated for The Show of 2021 and The Drama Show of 2021. Ellen Pompeo also received nominations as The Female TV Star of 2021 and The Drama TV Star of 2021, both for her work on the series. The Drama Show of 2021 and The Female TV star of 2021 both won in their respective categories, while the other two nominations went to Loki and Chase Stokes for Outer Banks, respectively. For the 33rd GLAAD Media Awards Grey's Anatomy received its tenth nomination for Outstanding Drama Series, an award in which nominated television series must have an LGBT character in a leading, supporting, or recurring role; but it was ultimately awarded to Pose. Chandra Wilson also received an Outstanding Supporting Actress in a Drama Series nomination for her work on the series at the 53rd NAACP Image Awards. This award was lost to Mary J. Blige for Power Book II: Ghost.

Ratings
The season was ABC's most-watched television series during the 2020–2021 television season. Throughout its broadcast, in same-day viewership, the season averaged a 1.02 rating in the 18–49 demographic and 5.17 million viewers, down 20 and 17 percent, respectively, from the previous season. In Live+7 the season averaged a 1.9 rating in the 18–49 demographic and 8.16 million viewers, down 17 and 13 percent from the sixteenth season.

Notes

References

External links
 

2020 American television seasons
2021 American television seasons
Grey's Anatomy seasons

Television productions postponed due to the COVID-19 pandemic
Television shows about the COVID-19 pandemic